Ichthyomyzon is a genus of northern lampreys in the sub-family Petromyzontinae, native to North America.

Species
There are currently six recognized species in this genus:
 Ichthyomyzon bdellium (D. S. Jordan, 1885) (Ohio lamprey)
 Ichthyomyzon castaneus Girard, 1858 (Chestnut lamprey)
 Ichthyomyzon fossor Reighard & Cummins, 1916 (Northern brook lamprey)
 Ichthyomyzon gagei C. L. Hubbs & Trautman, 1937 (Southern brook lamprey)
 Ichthyomyzon greeleyi C. L. Hubbs & Trautman, 1937 (Mountain brook lamprey)
 Ichthyomyzon unicuspis C. L. Hubbs & Trautman, 1937 (Silver lamprey)

References 

 
Petromyzontidae
Jawless fish genera